Stupiny Derevenki is a rural locality (a village) in Gorod Vyazniki, Vyaznikovsky District, Vladimir Oblast, Russia. The population was 38 as of 2010.

Geography 
Stupiny Derevenki is located 9 km north of Vyazniki (the district's administrative centre) by road. Mitiny Derevenki is the nearest rural locality.

References 

Rural localities in Vyaznikovsky District